The following is a list of the Teen Choice Award winners and nominees for Choice Movie Villain. The award has had several minor name changes:

 From 1999 to 2002 the award was known as Choice Sleazebag
 In 2003 it was awarded as Choice Villain
 In 2004 it was awarded as Choice Movie Sleazebag
 In 2005 the award category was split into Choice Movie Bad Guy and Choice Movie Sleazebag
 In 2006 the two award categories were merged back into Choice Movie Sleazebag
 From 2007 to present it was awarded as Choice Movie Villain

Winners and nominees

References

External links
Official website 

Villain Movie